The score to the film Cobb by Elliot Goldenthal was released in 1994.

The score
Goldenthal himself can be heard performing the guttural vocals on the opening cue, a Baptist hymn of the sort Cobb had heard as a young child. This can be heard below.

Goldenthal's feelings on the score:

Reception

Allmusic wrote that "What could have amounted to little more than a giant mess is in fact Goldenthal's most sophisticated and ambitious score to date..."

Track listing 
 Variations on an Old Baptist Hymn (3:05)
 Stump Meets Cobb (1:50)
 Cooperstown Aria (Part I) (1:43)
 Nevada Nightlight (2:28)
 Reno Ho' (Part I) (2:37)
 Newsreel Mirror (3:26)
 Meant Monk (2:17)
 Cooperstown Aria (Part II) (2:00)
 Winter Walk (1:11)
 Hart and Hunter (1:16)
 Georgia Peach Rag (1:30)
 The Baptism (1:30)
 Reno Ho' (Part II) (2:35)
 The Homecoming (6:18)
 Sour Mash Scherzo (1:09)
 Cobb Dies (1:49)
 The Beast Within (2:24) - (from "Alien³ soundtrack")
 The Ball Game - Sister Wynona Carr (2:24)

Audio
 This track features vocals by Goldenthal.
 This track exemplifies the duality of the score.
 Typical Goldenthalian brass and horns dominate this track.

Crew/Credit
Music Composed by Elliot Goldenthal (except track 18)
Music Produced by Matthias Gohl
Orchestrated by Robert Elhai and Elliot Goldenthal
Conducted by Jonathan Sheffer
Recorded and Mixed by Joel Iwataki
Electronic Music Produced by Richard Martinez
Music Editors: Dan Carlin

References

External links
 Page for the score on Goldenthals site

Elliot Goldenthal soundtracks
1995 soundtrack albums
Ty Cobb
Biographical film soundtracks
Sony Classical Records soundtracks